M is the debut studio album by black metal project Myrkur, by Danish musician and singer-songwriter Amalie Bruun. Produced by Kristoffer "Garm" Rygg of Ulver, it was released on 21 August 2015 through Relapse Records.

Featuring a black and gothic metal sound, the album melds influences from various genres, including second wave black metal, atmospheric post-metal, gothic, darkwave, Scandinavian folk and classical music. The album was named the Best Hard Rock Album of 2015 by Gaffa.

Critical reception

Upon its release, M received positive reviews from music critics. At Metacritic, which assigns a normalized rating out of 100 to reviews from critics, the album received an average score of 83, which indicates "universal acclaim", based on 10 reviews, and was the 85th highest rated album of 2015. Allmusic's Thom Jurek wrote: "Myrkur's music melds all of her adopted stylistic elements, lets their seams show, and emerges with an innovative, alchemical creation of her own. M expands on black metal's boundaries yet holds its dark, foreboding spirit close." The Austin Chronicle critic Michael Toland stated: "Danish raven Amalie Bruun integrates extreme intensity into both genres' [goth/black metal's] inherent drama." Sean Barry of Consequence of Sound thought that "M doesn’t differentiate itself greatly from the early work of many black metal artists." Barry further added: "The album shines with potential and the promise that a more unique followup waits further down the trail."

Exclaim! critic Natalie Zina Walschots praised the album, writing: "The textures of M are even more finely hewn and interwoven than its predecessor, resulting in a record that is at once profoundly tactile and deeply sensual." Grayson Haver Currin of Pitchfork thought that "on M, Bruun is free and clear of any identity drama—and a much more convincing bandleader for it." Spin critic Colin Joyce stated: "What remains Bruun’s strongest suit is the way she juxtaposes the extremity of her influences." Joyce further concluded: "She comes out of more subdued sections to use blast beats like scare tactics, drops in glacial vocal harmonies as soothing lullabies." The Quietus' Dean Brown was also positive in his assessment of the album, writing: "By conveying the masculine and feminine duality inherent in old musical traditions and modern musical developments, Bruun has composed a truly rewarding record that defies direct categorisation."

Nevertheless, Sputnikmusic's Elijah K. gave the album a mixed review, describing the album's sound as "painfully bland and too on the nose."

Track listing

Personnel
Album personnel as adapted from Bandcamp.

Myrkur
 Amalie Bruun – vocals, guitar, piano, production

Session musicians
 Teloch (Mayhem, Nidingr) – guitar, bass 
 Øyvind Myrvoll (Nidingr) – drums
 Ole-Henrik Moe – fiðla, Hardingfele, violin
 Håvard Jørgensen – acoustic guitar
 Tone Reichelt – horn
 Martin Taxt – tuba
 Chris Amott (Arch Enemy)  –  additional guitar (7)

Production and design
 Kristoffer "Garm" Rygg (Ulver) – mixing, production
 Anders Møller – mixing
 Jaime Gomez Arellano – mastering
 Trine + Kim Design Studio – photography
 Orion Landau – design

Charts

References

External links
 
 
Valhalla - epic Nordic mythology animation from 1986, serves as the theme for the title of the song "Jeg er guden, I er tjenerne". Section on Loki talking to the kids (22:58 mins).https://www.imdb.com/title/tt0094238/reviews?ref_=tt_urv . This was confirmed by Amalie Bruun on her YouTube channel.

2015 debut albums
Relapse Records albums
Myrkur albums